Taniatrechus setosus is a species of beetle in the family Carabidae, the only species in the genus Taniatrechus.

References

Trechinae